The Little Minister is a 1921 American silent drama film produced by Famous Players-Lasky and distributed by Paramount Pictures. It is based on an 1891 novel and 1897 play by J. M. Barrie. Betty Compson stars in the film. Earlier film adaptations of Barrie's novel were mad and this one was released within weeks of a version by Vitagraph starring Alice Calhoun.

Plot
As described in a film magazine, when the weavers of Thurms, Scotland, enraged by the reduction in the price of the "web," burn down a factory, Gavin (Hackathorne), the "little minister," intervenes with the constables on their behalf. His intervention is resented and he has a clash with Thomas (Oliver), riot leader and chief elder of the Kirk. The constables are hooted out of town.

Lady Babbie (Compson), a supposed young gypsy woman, is suspected of having notified the police against the rioters, but when Gavin questions her, her beauty charms him and he allows her to go. She is in fact Lady Barbara, daughter of the magistrate Lord Rintoul (Stevens), who knows nothing of her gypsy wanderings. She is engaged to Captain Halliwell (Barrie), commander of the troops at the barracks. When she hears him order the troops out after the rioters, she decides to warn the weavers who are preparing for the return of the constables or soldiers. Sentinels are posted and told to blow a horn when the military approaches.

Hearing of this, Babbie attempts to blow a horn but fails. When Gavin appears, she induces him to blow the instrument. He becomes enraged when he learns that he has been tricked. The two rejoin the weavers and assist them in escaping. Captain Halliwell orders Babbie's arrest. Disguised in a cloak and hood, she prevails upon Gavin to pass her off as his wife. A reward is then offered for her arrest. Gavin pleads with Lord Rintoul for her release and confesses that he warned the weavers. Babbie has made her escape and, upon returning home, overhears Gavin pleading with her father. Lord Rintoul admires his bravery and, although requested by Captain Halliwell, does not order Gavin's arrest. The Lord says that if Gavin had announced that the gypsy is his wife, she is his under Scottish law.

Gavin is ordered by the elders of the Kirk to resign or leave Thurms, but he refuses. Babbie enters and when she uncovers her head, Lord Rintoul and Captain Halliwell recognize her. They are forced to make the best of the situation and walk away in a rage when Gavin, who loves her, pulls her to his heart.

Cast
Betty Compson as Babbie
George Hackathorne as Gavin
Edwin Stevens as Lord Rintoul
Nigel Barrie as Captain Halliwell
Will R. Walling as Doctor McQueen
Guy Oliver as Thomas Whammond
Fred Huntley as Peter Tosh
Robert Brower as Hendry Munn
Joseph Hazelton as John Spens
Mary Wilkinson as Nancy Webster

Preservation
The Little Minister is a rarely seen Compson though prints are held at Cinematheque Royale de Belgique, BFI London, and Filmmuseum Nederlands (EYE Institute).

See also
The House That Shadows Built (1931) a promotional film for Paramount with a clip of this movie

References

External links

Newspaper advertisement

1921 films
American silent feature films
Films based on British novels
Films based on works by J. M. Barrie
Paramount Pictures films
1921 drama films
Silent American drama films
American black-and-white films
Films directed by Penrhyn Stanlaws
1920s American films